The Farman F.130 was a 1920s French biplane designed by Farman as a long-range day bomber.

Development
The F.130 was a single-engined biplane design in the BN.3 category based on the larger twin-engined F.60 Goliath. The F.130 had a conventional tailskid landing gear and three open tandem cockpits. It was powered by a nose-mounted 447 kW (600 hp) Farman 18Wd W-18 piston engine.

Following a series of test flights it was underpowered with only one engine and it failed to arouse any interest from either domestic or export customers and was not ordered into production.

Variants
F.130 BN.3 Three seater night bomber, one built.
F.130T The almost identical transport variant of the F.130 bomber. one built.

Specifications

Notes

Bibliography

1920s French bomber aircraft
F.0130